"Dance Your Pain Away" is the second international single from the album A  by Swedish recording artist and former ABBA member Agnetha Fältskog. On  it was released in the United States, and on  worldwide.

General Information

Dance Your Pain Away is an uptempo pop song, much more upbeat compared with the previous single When You Really Loved Someone. The single was added to BBC Radio 2's 'A' list in July 2013, quickly reaching number one on their airplay chart before the single was released.

Competition

A competition was held on Agnetha's official web site where fans were invited to submit videos to YouTube of them dancing to the song. Visitors to the site could vote for their favourite videos. The Top 10 videos by vote were selected to feature in the official video clip for the song.

Formats and track listing

Chart performance

References 

2013 songs
Agnetha Fältskog songs
Songs written by Jörgen Elofsson
Universal Music Group singles
2013 singles